KAIR may refer to:
 KAIR-FM, a radio station (93.7 FM) licensed to Horton, Kansas
 KAIR (AM), a former radio station (1470 AM) licensed to Atchison, Kansas, United States, which was deleted in 2019
 KFFN, a radio station (1490 AM) licensed to serve Tucson, Arizona, United States, which held the call sign KAIR from 1956 to 1989
 KAir, Kair Battery uses potassium and air (which combust when combined) to power a large-scale battery that costs less to produce and is more efficient than other technologies but doesn't create toxic byproducts.